Suleiman Arabiyat (1938 – 23 October 2013) was a Jordanian academic, politician and writer. He served as agriculture minister between 1989 and 1990.

Career
Arabiyat was born in Salt in 1938. He became a professor and researcher at the University of Jordan during the early 1970s and joined the then new agriculture faculty. He served as dean of the same faculty in 1989. He furthermore served as president of Al-Balqa` Applied University and Mutah University. During his life he also assumed various positions at the ministry of agriculture and he was agriculture minister between 1989 and 1990.

References

1938 births
2013 deaths
People from Al-Salt
Heads of universities in Jordan
Academic staff of the University of Jordan
Academic staff of Al-Balqa` Applied University
Academic staff of Mutah University
Agriculture ministers of Jordan